Below is a list of members of the 4th National Assembly of Namibia. They were selected by their parties based on the results of the 2004 parliamentary election. This National Assembly, like each of the previous National Assemblies, was led by the South West Africa People's Organization.

South West Africa People's Organization
 Theo-Ben Gurirab Speaker of the National Assembly
 Doreen Sioka Deputy Speaker of the National Assembly 
 Nahas Angula Prime Minister
 Libertine Amathila
 Ngarikutuke Tjiriange 
 John Pandeni 
 Jerry Ekandjo 
 Richard Kamwi 
 Saara Kuugongelwa-Amadhila 
 Joel Kaapanda 
 Marco Hausiku 
 Albert Kawana
 Utoni Nujoma 
 Loide Kasingo 
 Immanuel Ngatjizeko
 Pendukeni Iivula-Ithana
 Petrus Iilonga
 Teopolina Mushelenga 
 Alpheus ǃNaruseb
 Nangolo Mbumba 
 Erkki Nghimtina
 Bernhardt Esau 
 Lempy Lucas 
 Victor Simunja 
 Hansina Christiaan 
 Pohamba Shifeta 
 Angelika Muharukwa
 John Mutorwa
 Petrina Haingura
 Paulus Kapia
 Willem Konjore
 Lucia Basson 
 Abraham Iyambo
 Ben Amathila 
 Isak Katali 
 Peya Mushelenga
 Leon Jooste 
 Gabriel Shihepo
 Nicky Nashandi 
 Tjekero Tweya 
 Hage Geingob 
 Moses Amweelo 
 Marlene Mungunda
 Royal ǀUiǀoǀoo
 Peter Tsheehama 
 Kazenambo Kazenambo 
 Hans Booys
 Raphael Dinyando 
 Rosalia Nghidinwa  
 Evelyn ǃNawases
 Tommy Nambahu 
 Nickey Iyambo 
 Netumbo Nandi-Ndaitwah  
 Samuel Ankama
 Elia Kaiyamo  
 Jeremia Nambinga
 Dickson Namoloh 
 Rebecca Ndjoze-Ojo 
 Paul Smit 
 Ida Hoffmann
 Alexia Manombe-Ncube  
 Reggie Diergaardt

Congress of Democrats
 Ben Ulenga
 Nora Schimming-Chase
 Tsudao Gurirab
 Elma Dienda
 Kalla Gertze

Democratic Turnhalle Alliance
 Katuutire Kaura 
 Phillemon Moongo 
 Johan De Waal 
 McHenry Venaani

United Democratic Front
 Justus ǁGaroëb
 Gustaphine Tjombe
 Michael Goreseb

National Unity Democratic Organisation
 Kuaima Riruako
 Arnold Tjihuiko 
 Asser Mbai
 Mburumba Kerina

Monitor Action Group
 Jurie Viljoen

Republic Party
 Henk Mudge

References

4th
2000s in Namibia